Vazman or Vezman or Vozman may refer to:
 Vazman, Chehel Cheshmeh
 Vezman, Qaratureh